The South Africa cricket team toured the West Indies in June and July 2021 to play two Test matches and five Twenty20 International (T20I) matches. The Test series formed part of the inaugural 2019–2021 ICC World Test Championship. The fixtures for the tour were confirmed by Cricket West Indies in May 2021.

South Africa won the first Test by an innings and 63 runs inside three days. South Africa won the second Test match by 158 runs to take the series 2–0.

On 29 June 2021, the South African players wore black armbands in remembrance of former South African team manager Goolam Rajah, and a one-minute's silence was observed prior to the start of play. South Africa's Tabraiz Shamsi dedicated the team's one-run victory over the West Indies as a tribute to Goolam. The West Indies won the fourth T20I match by 21 runs, to tie the series at 2–2 with one game to play. South Africa won the fifth T20I by 25 runs, winning the series 3–2.

Background
Originally, the tour was scheduled to take place in July and August 2020. The first two T20I matches would have been played at the Central Broward Regional Park in Florida. The Test series would have formed part of the inaugural 2019–2021 ICC World Test Championship. However, the series was later postponed, as the West Indies toured England at the same time, after those fixtures were rescheduled due to the COVID-19 pandemic.

In July 2020, Johnny Grave, chief executive of Cricket West Indies, suggested that the series could take place in September 2020. Also in July 2020, the International Cricket Council (ICC) confirmed it was their priority to reschedule the matches, along with the five other World Test Championship series that had been postponed due to the pandemic. On 1 August 2020, Graeme Smith confirmed that the tour had been postponed indefinitely, due to schedule clashes with the 2020 Caribbean Premier League and the 2020 Indian Premier League. In April 2021, it was reported that the tour would be taking place in June 2021, but this was initially thrown into further doubt when Cricket South Africa was threatened with "defunding" and "derecognising" by Nathi Mthethwa, South Africa's Minister of Arts and Culture. However, after sanctions were not imposed on Cricket South Africa, the tour dates were confirmed in May 2021.

Squads

On 18 May 2021, Cricket West Indies (CWI) named a 18-man provisional squad for the T20I matches, with Kieron Pollard captaining the team. On 4 June 2021, CWI named a 17-man provisional squad for the Test matches, with Kraigg Brathwaite named as the team's captain. Ahead of the second Test, CWI recalled Darren Bravo and Shannon Gabriel for the match, with Nkrumah Bonner being unavailable due to suffering with a concussion in the first Test. Ahead of the T20I series, Dwaine Pretorius tested positive for COVID-19 and was replaced in South Africa's squad by Wiaan Mulder. Beuran Hendricks was also added to South Africa's T20I squad. Ahead of the third T20I, Shimron Hetmyer was added to the West Indies' squad, and Akeal Hosein was added to their squad ahead of the fourth T20I. For the fifth T20I, Sheldon Cottrell replaced Fabian Allen in the West Indies' squad.

Test series

1st Test

2nd Test

T20I series

1st T20I

2nd T20I

3rd T20I

4th T20I

5th T20I

Notes

References

External links
 Series home at ESPN Cricinfo

2021 in West Indian cricket
2021 in South African cricket
International cricket competitions in 2021
South African cricket tours of the West Indies
Cricket events postponed due to the COVID-19 pandemic